The women's 200 metre individual medley competition of the swimming events at the 1975 Pan American Games took place on 19 October. The last Pan American Games champion was Leslie Cliff of Canada.

This race consisted of four lengths of the pool, one each in backstroke, breaststroke, butterfly and freestyle swimming.

Results
All times are in minutes and seconds.

Heats

Final 
The final was held on October 19.

References

Swimming at the 1975 Pan American Games
Pan